England Creek is a rural locality split between Somerset Region and City of Brisbane, Queensland, Australia.

Geography
The locality lies a short distance south-east of Lake Wivenhoe.

England Creek (the watercourse) forms part of the eastern boundary before flowing through to the Brisbane River.

The Brisbane Valley Highway and the Wivenhoe Somerset Road (State Route 31) pass to the south-west, while the Mount Nebo Road (also part of State Route 32) runs along the north-eastern boundary. The main route through the locality is England Creek Road, which enters from the Brisbane Valley Highway.

History
The locality presumably takes its name from the creek.

Education 
There are no schools in England Creek. The nearest government primary schools are Mount Nebo State School in neighbouring Mount Nebo to the south-east and Fernvale State School in neighbouring Fernvale to the south-west. The nearest government secondary schools are Lowood State High School in Lowood to the south-west and Ferny Grove State High School in Ferny Grove to the south-west.

References

External links

Suburbs of Somerset Region
Suburbs of the City of Brisbane
Localities in Queensland